Kartamak (Qartamaq) is a rural locality (a selo) in Tavlarovsky Selsoviet, Buzdyaksky District, Bashkortostan, Russia. The population was 283 as of 2010. There are 4 streets.

Geography 
Kartamak is located 32 km north of Buzdyak (the district's administrative centre) by road. Stary Karbash is the nearest rural locality.

References 

Rural localities in Buzdyaksky District